LankaCom is a Sri Lanka-based telecommunications company. Founded in 1991, it is a subsidiary of Singtel and was the first company granted a Communication Operator License in the country.

References 
LankaCom build IT market
Telecom Ministry says Lanka Internet could continue with its existing license to offer voice service
Sri Lanka firms providing disaster recovery for BPOs look for more business

External links 
 LankaCom Official WebSite
 SingTel WebSite
 TRCSL Official WebSite

Telecommunications companies of Sri Lanka
Telecommunications companies established in 1991
Sri Lankan companies established in 1991